Asota concolora is a moth of the family Erebidae first described by Charles Swinhoe in 1903. It is found on Madagascar.

References

Asota (moth)
Lepidoptera of Madagascar
Moths of Madagascar
Moths of Africa
Moths described in 1903